Octubre (Spanish: October) was a Communist literary magazine which was published in Madrid between 1933 and 1934. The subtitle of the magazine was Escritores y artistas revolutionarios (Spanish: Revolutionary writers and artists).

History and profile
The founders of Octubre were Rafael Alberti, his wife María Teresa León and César Arconada. The magazine was started in Summer 1933 after the visit of Alberti and León to the Soviet Union. Some of the contributors included Antonio Machado, Emilio Prados and Luis Cernuda. 

Octubre was published on high-quality paper and frequently featured photographs most of which displayed scenes from Soviet life. The magazine adopted a Soviet-type avant-garde literary approach and had a Stalinist political stance. Although the magazine was not financed by the Comintern, it featured some articles, essays, and photos provided by the Soviets.

See also
 List of avant-garde magazines

References

External links

1933 establishments in Spain
1934 disestablishments in Spain
Anti-fascism in Spain
Avant-garde magazines
Communist magazines
Defunct literary magazines published in Europe
Defunct political magazines published in Spain
Literary magazines published in Spain
Magazines established in 1933
Magazines disestablished in 1934
Magazines published in Madrid
Spanish-language magazines
Stalinism